4K1G is an Indigenous Australian radio station based in Townsville, Queensland.

Programming
The station is aimed at the Aboriginal and Tores Strait Island people but plays a wide selection of music, news, sport and talk radio that appeals to the whole community.

See also
Media in Townsville

External links
4K1G.org

Townsville
Australian radio networks
Community radio stations in Australia
Indigenous Australian music
Indigenous Australian radio